The 1978 Northern Iowa Panthers football team represented the University of Northern Iowa during the 1978 NCAA Division II football season as a member of the Association of Mid-Continent Universities. Led by 19th-year head coach Stan Sheriff, the Panthers compiled an overall record of 2–9 and a mark of 0–5 in conference play, placing last out of six teams in the conference.

Schedule

References 

Northern Iowa
Northern Iowa Panthers football seasons
Northern Iowa Panthers football